Muhammad Arif Khan Sindhila is a Pakistani politician who was a Member of the Provincial Assembly of the Punjab, from May 2013 to May 2018.

Early life and education
He was born on 1 May 1958 in Sheikhupura.

He graduate from University of the Punjab and has the degree of Bachelor of Arts. He hold a Diploma in Interior Designing and Construction from Le Chalit in France.

Political career

He was elected to the Provincial Assembly of the Punjab as a candidate of Pakistan Muslim League (Nawaz) from Constituency PP-167 (Sheikhupura-VI) in 2013 Pakistani general election.

References

Living people
Punjab MPAs 2013–2018
1958 births
Pakistan Muslim League (N) politicians